Western Pluck is a 1926 American silent Western film directed by Travers Vale and starring Art Acord, Marceline Day, and Ray Ripley.

Plot
As described in a film magazine review, cowpuncher Arizona Allen witnesses a runaway stage coach when the horses flee after a shot fired by Rowdy Dyer, done as a greeting for his sister Clare who is visiting from the East, which was mistaken for a robbery. Allen chases down and stops the stage by bringing the galloping horses to a halt. He promises Clare that he would look after her wild brother. Later the stage is really held up and Rowdy is suspected of the crime. Circumstantial evidence is against him, but Allen supports him and fights for him until his innocence is proved. Allen wins the affection of Clare.

Cast
 Art Acord as 'Arizona' Allen 
 Marceline Day as Clare Dyer 
 Ray Ripley as Gale Collins 
 Robert Rose as 'Rowdy' Dyer 
 William Welsh as 'Dynamite' Dyer 
 Helen Cobb as Molly 
 S.E. Jennings as Buck Zaney 
 Charles Newton as Sheriff Wayne

References

Bibliography
 Munden, Kenneth White. The American Film Institute Catalog of Motion Pictures Produced in the United States, Part 1. University of California Press, 1997.

External links
 

1926 films
1926 Western (genre) films
Universal Pictures films
Films directed by Travers Vale
American black-and-white films
Silent American Western (genre) films
1920s English-language films
1920s American films